Perry Bräutigam (born 28 March 1963) is a German Association football coach and a former player who works as goalkeeper coach for RB Leipzig.

Playing career
Bräutigam was born in Altenburg. A goalkeeper, he played over 450 matches at the first and second level of the East and unified German football pyramid. He also won three caps for the East Germany national team.

Coaching career
Immediately after his playing career ended, Bräutigam started working  as goalkeeper coach for F.C. Hansa Rostock.  When his contract ended in 2009, he moved to the newly formed RB Leipzig, also as goalkeeper coach.

Honours
 FDGB-Pokal: runner-up 1987–88

References

External links
 
 
 

1963 births
Living people
German footballers
East German footballers
East Germany international footballers
Association football goalkeepers
FC Carl Zeiss Jena players
1. FC Nürnberg players
FC Hansa Rostock players
Bundesliga players
2. Bundesliga players
DDR-Oberliga players
People from Altenburg
Footballers from Thuringia